Julian David Morris (born 13 January 1983) is an English actor. After appearing in the British television series The Knock (1996) and Fish (2000) during his teenage years, he had his first starring role in the American slasher film Cry Wolf (2005). He subsequently had supporting roles in the thriller Donkey Punch (2008), the historical drama Valkyrie (2008), and another slasher film Sorority Row (2009).

Morris has also appeared in American television as a series regular on Pretty Little Liars and Hand of God, and had recurring roles on Once Upon a Time and New Girl.

Early life
Morris was born in Crouch End, North London, and grew up in Muswell Hill. He is the son of South African-born Glen and Zimbabwean-born Andrea Morris, and spent a lot of time in both countries growing up. He has a younger sister, Amy, and is from a Jewish family.

Career
Morris began acting at the Anna Scher Theatre in London. It was there, when he was 13, that a director on the British drama series The Knock spotted him and asked him to play a boy pushed into the drug trade. Morris continued his intensive training under Anna Scher for the next eight years. In this period more opportunities arose, and after appearing in several television shows, films and commercials, he went on to spend three seasons with the Royal Shakespeare Company, working with directors such as Steven Pimlott, Tim Albery and Elijah Moshinsky, and alongside actors like Simon Russell Beale, Samuel West and Roger Allam.

Morris made his US debut in the 2005 slasher film Cry Wolf as lead character Owen Matthews, followed by the role of James Edwards in the 2006 drama film Whirlygirl.

Morris was next seen in the independent horror film Donkey Punch as Josh, critically honoured after its screening at the 2008 Sundance Film Festival. He also appeared in Valkyrie starring Tom Cruise and the Sugababes video "Freak Like Me". Morris next had a supporting role in the slasher film Sorority Row as Andy. In 2010, he played the recurring role of Agent Owen in 24.

Morris was part of the main cast of the 2010 ABC documentary-style dramedy series My Generation, playing "The Rich Kid" Anders Holt. Morris also starred in the teen drama Pretty Little Liars as Dr. Wren Kingston. In July 2012, Morris joined the ABC series Once Upon a Time as Prince Phillip.

Morris starred as Victor in the film Kelly + Victor, which premiered on 16 October 2012 at the BFI London Film Festival, and was released theatrically in the UK on 20 September 2013. The film won the BAFTA Award for Outstanding Debut by a British Writer, Director or Producer in 2014. The following year, Morris portrayed the lead role of Gareth in the fantasy adventure film Dragonheart 3: The Sorcerer's Curse.

In March 2014, Morris was cast as Reverend Paul Curtis in the Amazon Studios pilot Hand of God. The pilot was ordered to full series by Amazon Studios in October 2014. In August 2014, he landed a recurring guest role on the Fox sitcom New Girl, playing Ryan Geauxinue.

In May 2016, Morris landed a major role in the film Mark Felt: The Man Who Brought Down the White House playing Bob Woodward, the Washington Post reporter who teamed with Carl Bernstein to expose the Watergate dealings.

In 2017 he played the part of Adam Berryman in the two-part TV drama Man in an Orange Shirt (part of BBC television's Gay Britannia season), opposite Vanessa Redgrave.

Personal life
Morris lives in Los Angeles, California.

Morris's grandfather was captured by the Nazis during World War II and was sent to a concentration camp in Italy for two months. In April 2021, Morris said during an interview that he felt what his grandfather had gone through while performing in Valkyrie.

On 2 December 2021, Morris announced on Instagram that he was celebrating his 18th anniversary with his partner, Landon Ross. Shortly after, it was reported that the two had married recently.

Filmography

Film

Television

Music videos

References

External links

 

1983 births
20th-century English male actors
21st-century English male actors
Alumni of the Anna Scher Theatre School
British expatriate male actors in the United States
English expatriates in the United States
English male child actors
English male film actors
English male television actors
English people of Jewish descent
English people of South African descent
English people of Zambian descent
Jewish English male actors
Living people
Male actors from London
People from Crouch End
People from Muswell Hill
Royal Shakespeare Company members
English gay actors
English LGBT actors
LGBT male actors
LGBT Jews